Mary C. Pendleton (born June 15, 1940) is a retired American diplomat who was the first American ambassador to Moldova after it gained independence from the Soviet Union (1992 until 1995).

Pendleton graduated from Spalding University (B.A., 1962) and Indiana University (M.A., 1969).

References

American women ambassadors
People from Jefferson County, Kentucky
Spalding University alumni
Indiana University alumni
1940 births
Ambassadors of the United States to Moldova
Living people